Bab Azoun ("Gate of Grief") is the name of a city gate of Algiers.
The rue Bab Azoun  which runs parallel to the boulevard de la Republique and crosses the rue Bab El Oued in the city center.

Buildings and structures in Algiers